National Route 266 is a national highway of Japan connecting Amakusa, Kumamoto and Chūō-ku, Kumamoto in Japan, with a total length of 155.3 km (96.5 mi).

References

National highways in Japan
Roads in Kumamoto Prefecture